Stolley is a surname. Notable people with the surname include:

Patrick Stolley (born 1970), American audio engineer, singer, songwriter, and producer
Richard Stolley (1928–2021), American journalist and magazine editor

See also
Stolle, surname